Sophie Walburga Margaretha Hoechstetter (15 August 1873 – 4 April 1943) was a German painter, poet, and author.

Hoechstetter was born in Pappenheim as the youngest daughter of a pharmacist. She wrote numerous novels and poems. She admired George Gordon Byron and Johann Wolfgang von Goethe. Hoechstetter died in Dachau on the farm of Carl Olof and Elly Petersen. She was buried in the St. Gallus Church in Pappenheim.

References

1873 births
1943 deaths
20th-century German women artists
People from Pappenheim
19th-century German painters
German women poets
German women novelists
20th-century German painters